American singer-songwriter SoMo has released five studio albums, three mixtapes, and thirty-nine singles. His debut album, SoMo, was released on April 8, 2014, debuting at number six on the Billboard 200 and at number two on the Top R&B/Hip-Hop Albums charts. The album's lead single, Ride, was released December 7, 2013 and peaked at number seventy-six on the Billboard Hot 100 chart and number eleven on the US Hot R&B/Hip-Hop Songs.

Studio albums

Mixtapes

Singles

Promotional singles

References

Contemporary R&B discographies
Hip hop discographies
Discographies of American artists